Bithia Mary (or May) Croker (née Sheppard, c. 1848 or 1849 – 20 October 1920) was an Irish novelist, most of whose work concerns life and society in British India. Her 1917 novel The Road to Mandalay, set in Burma, was the uncredited basis for a 1926 American silent film, of which only excerpts survive. She was also a notable writer of ghost stories.

Life
Bithia was born in Kilgefin, County Roscommon, Ireland, the only daughter of Rev. William Sheppard (died 1856), the Anglican Church of Ireland rector of Kilgefin, County Roscommon, who was also a writer and controversialist. She was educated at Rockferry, Cheshire and in Tours, France. She became famous as a horsewoman with the Kildare Hunt. In 1871, she married John Stokes Croker (1844–1911), an officer in the Royal Scots Fusiliers and later the Royal Munster Fusiliers.

In 1877, Bithia followed her husband to Madras and then to Bengal. She lived in India for 14 years, spending some time in the hill station of Wellington now in Tamil Nadu, where she wrote many of her works, having begun to do so as a distraction during the hot season. After her husband's retirement with the rank of lieutenant-colonel in 1892, the couple moved to County Wicklow, then to London, and finally to Folkestone, Kent, where her husband died in 1911. She had one daughter, Eileen (born 1872), who was also educated at Rockferry. Bithia remained immensely interested in reading, travel and theatre. She died at 30 Dorset Square, London, on 20 October 1920 and was buried in Folkestone.

Writing
Croker's prolific literary career spanned 37 years, from 1882 when she was 33 years old, until her death in London in 1920. Her last novel, The House of Rest, was published posthumously in 1921. She wrote 42 novels and 7 volumes of short stories.

Her first novel, Proper Pride (1880), was written secretly in Secunderabad in 1880, then read aloud to other women. The original manuscript was lost, but Croker rewrote it and had it published anonymously in the UK. Thought to be by a man, it received good reviews and had been reprinted 12 times by 1896. William Ewart Gladstone was observed reading it in the House of Commons. The book, according to a present-day account, "shows open sympathy with the male viewpoint and metes out punishing treatment to its spirited, horse-riding heroine, whose distrustful pride separates her from her devoted husband."

Croker's work has been praised in general for "a sensitive ear for speech, for idiom and the diction of different classes, which she reproduces in lively and entertaining dialogue." Tension often derives from threats to conventional order in society. Her second novel, Pretty Miss Neville (1883), was as popular as the first. The burden of social convention for a woman in India unwilling to marry the man for whom she has been sent out is explored in The Cat's Paw (1902), and that of a man who sinks socially in The Company's Servant (1907). Her Village Tales and Jungle Tragedies (1895) reflect a parallel interest in Indian rural life. Altogether 17 of the novels were set in India, one in Burma, and seven in Ireland.

There are intimations of Gothic fiction in some of Croker's work. Her 1905 story "The Little Brass God", for example, involves a statue of Kali, described as a "goddess of destruction", who brings various misfortunes on the Anglo-Indians who possess it. The curse is dispelled when the statue is stolen from them and dropped down a well.

Several of Croker's novels appeared in French, German, Hungarian and Norwegian translations. A volume of her ghost stories appeared at the turn of the millennium. Her story "To Let" (c. 1896) was included in The Oxford Book of Victorian Ghost Stories. One of her novels set in Ireland, Terence (1899), was adapted for the stage and ran for two years in the United States.

Croker had a wide literary acquaintance in London. Her novel Angel (1901) was dedicated to another novelist whose work centres on India: Alice Perrin. The author and academic Douglas Sladen went so far as to call her, with her "valued friends" Perrin and Flora Annie Steel, "three who have long divided the Indian Empire with Rudyard Kipling as a realm of fiction. Each in her own department is supreme."

Bibliography

Novels
Proper Pride: A Novel (London: Tinsley Brothers, 1882)
Pretty Miss Neville (London: Tinsley Brothers, 1883)
Some One Else (London: Sampson Low, 1885)
A Bird of Passage (London: Sampson Low, 1886)
Diana Barrington: A Romance of Central India (London: Ward and Downey, 1888)
Two Masters: A Novel (London: F V White, 1890)
Interference: A Novel (London: F V White, 1891)
A Family Likeness: A Sketch in the Himalayas (London: Chatto and Windus, 1892)
A Third Person: A Novel (London: F V White, 1893)
Mr Jervis (London: Chatto and Windus, 1894)
Married or Single? (London: Chatto and Windus, 1895)
The Real Lady Hilda: A Sketch (London: Chatto and Windus, 1896)
Beyond the Pale (London: Chatto and Windus, 1897)
Miss Balmaine's Past (London: Chatto and Windus, 1898)
Peggy of the Bartons (London: Methuen, 1898)
Infatuation (London: Chatto & Windus, 1899)
Terence (London: Chatto and Windus, 1899)
Angel: A Sketch in Indian Ink (London: Methuen, 1901)
The Cat's Paw (London: Chatto & Windus, 1902)
Johanna (London: Methuen & Co., 1903)
The Happy Valley, etc. (London: Methuen & Co., 1904)
Her Own People (London: Hurst & Blackett, 1905)
A Nine Day's Wonder (London: Methuen & Co., 1905)
The Youngest Miss Mowbray (London: Hurst & Blackett, 1906)
The Company's Servant: A Romance of Southern India (London: Hurst & Blackett, 1907)
The Spanish Necklace (London: Chatto & Windus, 1907)
Katherine the Arrogant (London: Methuen & Co., 1909)
Babes in the Wood (London: Methuen & Co., 1910)
Fame (London: Mills and Boon, 1910) 
A Rolling Stone (London: F. V. White & Co., 1911) 
The Serpent's Tooth (London: Hutchinson & Co., 1912) 
In Old Madras (London: Hutchinson & Co., 1913) 
Lismoyle (London: Hutchinson & Co., 1914 
Quicksands (London: Cassell and Company, 1915) 
Given in Marriage (London: Hutchinson & Co., 1916) 
The Road to Mandalay. A Tale of Burma (London: Cassell & Co., 1917) 
A Rash Experiment (London: Hutchinson & Co., 1917) 
Bridget (London: Hutchinson & Co., 1918) 
The Pagoda Tree (London: Cassell & Co., 1919) 
Blue China (London: Hutchinson & Co., 1919) 
The Chaperon (London: Cassell & Co., 1920) 
The House of Rest (London: Cassell & Co., 1921)

Short stories
To Let, etc. (London: Chatto and Windus, 1893) 
Village Tales and Jungle Tragedies, etc. (London: Chatto and Windus, 1895) 
In the Kingdom of Kerry and Other Stories (London: Chatto and Windus, 1896) 
Jason and Other Stories (London: Chatto and Windus, 1899) 
A State Secret and Other Stories (London: Methuen, 1901) 
The Old Cantonment and Other Stories of India and Elsewhere (London: Methuen & Co., 1905) 
Jungle Tales (London: Chatto and Windus, 1913) 
Odds and Ends (London: Hutchinson & Co., 1919)

Analysis
An in-depth and detailed study of her novels, with special reference to her depiction of India has been carried out by Dr S. G. Vaidya, under the supervision of Dr B. S. Naikar, former professor and chairman, Department of Studies in English, at Karnatak University. A discussion of the cultural context of Croker's fiction, together with close readings of several of her novels and stories, can be found in John Wilson Foster, Irish Novels 1890–1940: New Bearings in Culture and Fiction (Oxford, UK: OUP, 2008). Some present-day scholars have seen in Croker's work examples of a "conjoining of gender and colonialism".

References

External links

Works by Bithia Mary Croker at Veranda Archive

 
To Let (1906) online Retrieved 30 October 2015
Bibliography Retrieved 30 October 2015
A portrait photograph of Croker Retrieved 31 October 2015

1848 births
1920 deaths
19th-century Indian women writers
20th-century Indian women writers
20th-century Irish women writers
19th-century English writers
20th-century English writers
Academic staff of Karnatak University
Indian women short story writers
Indian women novelists
20th-century Indian novelists
19th-century Indian novelists
19th-century Indian short story writers
20th-century Indian short story writers
19th-century Irish women writers